Topyster Namasaka Muga, (born 1982) is a Kenyan telecommunication and fintech specialist, who is currently serving as the chief executive and founder of Prosper App.  Before launching her own venture in July 2020, her immediate former role was senior director of Financial Inclusion Africa, at Visa Inc., based in Nairobi, the capital city of Kenya. Prior to that, she headed Airtel Money in Kenya.

Early life and education
She was born in Mumias, an urban center nestled in the western part of Kenya. She was raised alongside five brothers by her mother, who was a fishmonger by trade.  Her father, a court prosecutor in Kakamega,  was a polygamist man who married 4 wives and sired 16 children.

She attended Mumias Central Primary School and later Alliance Girls' Secondary School where she sat for her KCSE exams. Upon completing high school, she enrolled at Strathmore University to pursue IMIS Higher Diploma. She was  awarded Best Student. 

In 2005, Muga was admitted into The Jomo Kenyatta Institute of Agriculture and Technology for a Bachelor's degree in Information Technology. She graduated in the top 1% of her class two years later with a First Class Honours.

She is an MBA holder from Institut Européen d'Administration des Affaires courtesy of the INSEAD MBA'75 Nelson Mandela Endowed Scholarship fund.

Career
After graduating from Strathmore University in 2003, she worked as an application and system support assistant in Barclays Bank of Kenya for approximately one year. The following year she was transferred to Barclays Bank of Uganda in the same role.

Airtel

In 2005, she started off at Airtel Kenya as an IT project coordinator and development engineer, while she concurrently pursued her first degree at Jomo Kenyatta University.  Muga rose through the ranks securing a promotion every year.  According to her profile on Airtel, she was the youngest female IT manager at 26 years. 

In 2010, she joined Airtel Africa as a Senior Manager, Group Value Added Services.  A position she held for a year before enrolling into INSEAD Business School in 2011.

In 2014, Bharti Airtel appointed her to head Airtel Money in Kenya. While serving in this role, she led the team that innovated Airtel Money Pesa Card, a Visa card that mirrored the Airtel Money account. Under her leadership, Airtel Money partnered up with United Bank of Kenya Limited to pioneer Akiba Mkononi, a mobile banking product that allowed its users to save on their phone.

Vodafone

After her MBA, she joined the Vodafone Group, as the M-Pesa principal product manager, based in the United Kingdom. In that role, she led M-Pesa’s commercial product development in emerging markets, including Kenya, Tanzania, Mozambique, the Democratic Republic of the Congo, Albania and Romania.

Visa

Later, Visa Inc. hired her as the Senior Director for Financial Inclusion for sub-Saharan Africa. According to Apantech digital blog, She advocated for the socioeconomic financial inclusion of women in Kenya and several other African countries.

Prosper

In July 2020, she launched a personal development app dubbed Prosper. She serves as the Chief Executive Officer.

Other achievements
Topyster Muga travels frequently and widely, giving lectures worldwide, including at the Financial Times summit in Lagos,
Nigeria, in 2018, and at the World Economic Forum
in South Africa in 2017. She also co-founded the Digniti Charitable Trust, and is a mentor at Zawadi Africa Education Fund. She also serves at the African Women in Fintech and Payments Advisory Board as the East African regional lead and Kenya’s ambassador.

Honors

Topyster has garnered the following honours and awards thus far; 

 INSEAD Nelson Mandela Scholarship - 2011
 Pink Potential Sub-Saharan Africa IT Woman of the Year- 2015
 Gold Stevie Technology  Woman of the Year- 2016
 TechWomen Emerging Leader- (2017)
 Women in Fintech Powerlist - (2017)
 Top 40 under 40 women in Kenya- (2018)

See also
 Marianne Mwaniki
 List of banks in Kenya

References

External links
Prosper App

Living people
1982 births
21st-century Kenyan businesswomen
21st-century Kenyan businesspeople
Strathmore University alumni 
INSEAD alumni       
People from Kakamega County
Jomo Kenyatta University of Agriculture and Technology alumni